The WWF World Martial Arts Heavyweight Championship was a professional wrestling heavyweight championship in the World Wrestling Federation (WWF) and later in New Japan Pro-Wrestling (NJPW). It was created on December 18, 1978, and awarded to NJPW mainstay Antonio Inoki by Vincent J. McMahon, upon Inoki's arrival in America. The title was known for being contested in matches billed as shoot wrestling fights. The WWF World Martial Arts Heavyweight Championship was contested solely in NJPW after the promotion became unaffiliated with the WWF in 1985.

History
During the thirtieth anniversary of Inoki's career, NJPW created the "Greatest 18 Club", a hall of fame. NJPW then created a new title, the Greatest 18 Championship, which was intended to complement the IWGP Heavyweight Championship. The Greatest 18 Championship was represented by the former Martial Arts Championship belt and was awarded to Riki Choshu in 1990. Choshu lost the title to The Great Muta in 1992. Muta retired the title on September 23 of that year, in order to focus on his IWGP Heavyweight Championship title defenses. The title was subsequently officially retired by NJPW.

Reigns

Combined reigns

References

WWE championships
New Japan Pro-Wrestling championships
World heavyweight wrestling championships